Douglas Smith Huyghue (1816-1891) was a Canadian and Australian poet, fiction writer, essayist, and artist.

Biography

Born April 23, 1816, in Charlottetown, Prince Edward Island, to an impoverished British lieutenant, it is believed Douglas Smith Huyghue was educated at the Saint John Grammar School. His first published poetry was in the Halifax Morning Post and Parliamentary Reporter, where his work appeared under the pseudonym 'Eugene'.  In the early 1840s, he began regularly contributing poetry, short fiction, and essays to the literary magazine Amaranth, published in Saint John, New Brunswick. His novel, Argimou: A Legend of the Micmac, was serialized in Amaranth in 1842 and was first published in book form in 1847.  At that time Huyghue also assisted province’s commissioner of Indian affairs in arranging an exhibition of Indian artefacts. In the late 1840s he moved to England, where he published a three-volume novel, Nomades of the West; or, Ellen Clayton (1850), and then immigrated to Australia on the Lady Peel in 1852.  In 1853 he became a clerk in the Office of Mines in the Ballarat goldfields, where he witnessed the Eureka Stockade revolt of 1854. His watercolor, "The Eureka Stockade," is exhibited at the Ballarat Fine Art Gallery. He continued working as a civil servant in Ballarat and Graytown, his last post being at the Department of Mines in Melbourne.  He died July 24, 1891.

Works

Nomades of the West; or, Ellen Clayton, 3 volumes. London: Bentley, 1850.
Argimou: A Legend of the Micmac, with an afterword by Gwendolyn Davies. Waterloo: Wilfrid Laurier University Press, 2017. Early Canadian Literature series.

Publications in Periodicals

'Recollections of Canada. The Scenery of the Ottawa,' Bentley's Miscellany (1849): 489–497.

'A Winter's Journey,' Bentley's Miscellany (1849): 630–638.

'My First Winter in the Woods of Canada,' Bentley's Miscellany (1850): 152–160.

'Forest Incidents—Recollections of Canada,' Bentley's Miscellany (1850): 472–477.

Notes

Canadian emigrants to Australia
19th-century Canadian poets
Canadian male poets
Australian poets
1816 births
1891 deaths
19th-century Australian artists
19th-century Canadian male writers
Writers from Charlottetown